Medal of Merit to the People may refer to:

 Medal of Merit to the People (Republika Srpska), a Republika Srpska medal
 Medal of Merit to the People (Yugoslavia)  ( / ), a Yugoslav medal